Derdas III was archon of Elimiotis in Upper Macedonia in 360–355 BC. He was probably a son of Derdas II. He had a brother named Machatas and a sister Phila, who was one of the first women Philip II of Macedon married.

Notes

References
Athenaeus of Naucratis. The Deipnosophists, Book XIII. 
Smith, William (editor); Dictionary of Greek and Roman Biography and Mythology, "Machatas", Boston, (1867).
Smith, William (editor); Dictionary of Greek and Roman Biography and Mythology, "Teleutias", Boston, (1867).

4th-century BC Greek people
Ancient Elimiotes